Lena Repinc (born 8 April 2003) is a Slovenian biathlete. She is a two-time Biathlon Youth World champion in Pursuit and Sprint. She competed at the 2020 Winter Youth Olympic Games in Lausanne, Switzerland.

Biathlon results
All results are sourced from the International Biathlon Union.

Youth Olympic Games

Junior/Youth World Championships
6 medals (2 gold, 4 silver)

References

External links

2003 births
Living people
Slovenian female biathletes
Biathletes at the 2020 Winter Youth Olympics